The South West Isle, part of the Kent Group, is an unpopulated  granite island, located in the Bass Strait, lying off the north-east coast of Tasmania, between the Furneaux Group and Wilsons Promontory in Victoria, Australia.

Fauna
Recorded breeding seabird, wader and waterbird species include little penguin, short-tailed shearwater, fairy prion, common diving-petrel, Pacific gull, silver gull, sooty oystercatcher and Cape Barren goose.  Reptiles present are the metallic skink, Bougainville's skink and White's skink.

See also

 List of islands of Tasmania
 Protected areas of Tasmania

References

External links
 

Protected areas of Tasmania
Islands of Bass Strait